Assunta "Tina" Meloni (born 21 April 1951) is a politician of San Marino. She was Captain Regent of San Marino for the term from 1 October 2008 to April 2009 together with Ernesto Benedettini. She is also a member of the Council of Europe.

Meloni is a member of the Popular Alliance.

References

1951 births
21st-century women politicians
Captains Regent of San Marino
Members of the Grand and General Council
Female heads of government
Female heads of state
Living people
Popular Alliance (San Marino) politicians
Sammarinese women in politics